Ultimate Motorsport was a British racing team who completed in the British Formula 3 Championship and the World Series by Renault Championship. The team closed near the end of the 2009 season.

History
The team were formed in 2007 and was headed by Barry Walsh. He enlisted 2 ex McLaren personnel, Jonny Ostrowski and Colin Morgan to set up and run the team in the 2007 British Formula 3 Championship. At the end of the year they joined forces with the French outfit Signature-Plus to create Ultimate Signature, to run in the World Series by Renault in 2008.

The team had considerable financial backing from the Angolan oil company Sonangol, who have helped to create the Ultimate Motorsport Academy, which aims to take young drivers from karting up to Formula One, passing through various formulae such as Formula BMW, Formula Three and World Series by Renault.

2008
The team began the season with two Brazilian drivers, long-time Formula Three racer Fabio Carbone and Claudio Cantelli, who graduated from the International Formula Master series. After a slow start to the season, which saw the team take one point from the first three rounds, Cantelli was replaced by Argentine Esteban Guerrieri, who was promoted from the Ultimate Motorsport British Formula 3 team.

At the fifth round of the season in Hungary, Carbone took the team's first podium position with third place in the sprint race, and the following day he won their first race after starting from Pole position. Carbone took two further victories at the Nürburgring and Estoril to finish third in the standings behind Julien Jousse and champion Giedo van der Garde.

After starting the feature race at Le Mans on pole, Guerrieri finished in third place to claim his first podium position before going on to win the final race of the season at Barcelona. He finished eighth in the championship despite missing the first five races of the season.

After securing eight podiums over the course of the year, Ultimate Signature finished their début season in a superb second place in the Teams' championship.

2009
For the 2009 the team signed Spanish driver Miguel Molina and British driver Greg Mansell son of former  Formula One world champion, Nigel Mansell,  Molina scored 3 podium finishes during the season, while Mansell scored only 4 points. Just before the Nürburgring rounds, the team lost its Sonangol backing and Mansell also decided to leave the team, and as a result the team were forced to withdraw from the Championship.

World Series by Renault results

* Cantelli's points were scored with the RC Motorsport team

References

External links

British auto racing teams
Auto racing teams established in 2007
2007 establishments in the United Kingdom
2009 disestablishments in the United Kingdom
World Series Formula V8 3.5 teams
Formula 3 Euro Series teams
Superleague Formula teams
British Formula Three teams
Auto racing teams disestablished in 2009